Richard Dixon was the coxswain of a 44-foot Motor Lifeboat, on the July 4th weekend of 1980, when his skill and daring enabled him to rescue stricken pleasure boat crew off Tillamook Bay, Oregon.
During the first incident a 58-foot yacht was in distress in the aftermath of hurricane Celia, and needed to seek sheltered waters, but wave conditions seemed likely to batter it apart if it tried to use the narrow entrance between two stone jetties to enter Tillamook Bay's harbor. Dixon and the coxswain of another motor lifeboat maneuvered beside the yacht, to absorb some of the wave energy as it entered harbor.

In the second incident two pleasure boat occupants had fallen overboard and were within fifty feet of being dashed upon the harbor's breakwater.
In spite of the danger of maneuvering so close to the crashing waves, in such high sea conditions, Dixon was able to rescue the pleasure boaters.

Dixon received Coast Guard Medals for both rescues.

USCGC Richard Dixon

In 2010 when the Coast Guard decided that all the new Sentinel class cutters would be named after Coast Guard personnel who had been recognized for their heroism Dixon was one of those to be honored.
The thirteenth cutter in the class was named USCGC Richard Dixon.  
She was the first Sentinel class cutter to be homeported in Puerto Rico.

References

United States Coast Guard non-commissioned officers
Year of death missing
Year of birth missing